Jeremiah E. Burke (June 25, 1867–October 29, 1931) was an American educator who served as superintendent of schools in Boston and Lawrence, Massachusetts.

Early life
Burke was born on June 25, 1867 in Frankfort, Maine to Patrick and Mary (Hughes) Burke. He attended Frankfort public schools and graduated from the East Maine Conference Seminary in 1886 and Colby College in 1890.

Career

From 1891 to 1893, Burke was superintendent of schools in Waterville, Maine. He spent a year as superintendent in Marlborough, Massachusetts before moving to the same position in Lawrence, where he oversaw a school system of over 9,000 pupils and 250 teachers. He pushed for the creation of Lawrence's Evening High School and oversaw the city's Normal and Training School for Teachers until it was made a part of the Lowell State Normal School in 1903.

In 1904, Burke was appointed to the board of supervisors of Boston Public Schools. In 1906, a regulation change resulted in Burke's title being changed from supervisor to assistant superintendent, although his duties remained the same. Following George H. Conley's death in 1905, Burke was considered for the position of superintendent, but Stratton D. Brooks was chosen instead. From 1914 to 1917 he was a member of the Massachusetts Board of Education. In 1917 he and Frank Ballou argued for the creation of junior high schools in Boston. In 1918, superintendent Franklin B. Dyer retired and the school committee deadlocked on the choice of his successor, with three of the assistant superintendents - Burke, Frank V. Thompson, and Augustine L. Rafter, receiving votes from the committee members. The stalemate lasted two months and was broken when one of Rafter's supporters agreed to break the deadlock by voting for Thompson. 

On October 23, 1921, Thompson died suddenly at his home in Brighton. On October 31, Burke was made acting superintendent. A week later the school committee voted to appoint him for the rest of Thompson's term. He was appointed to a full six-year term in 1924 and reappointed in 1930. On October 29, 1931, Burke died in his sleep at his home in Dorchester. He was survived by his wife, a son, and a daughter. He was buried in St. Joseph Cemetery. In 1934 the city's new girl's high school was named after Burke.

References

1867 births
1921 deaths
19th-century American educators
20th-century American educators
Boston Public Schools superintendents
Catholics from Maine
Catholics from Massachusetts
Colby College alumni
East Maine Conference Seminary alumni
Educators from Maine
Educators from Massachusetts
People from Boston
People from Frankfort, Maine
Burials at St. Joseph Cemetery (West Roxbury, Massachusetts)
School superintendents in Maine